Sachin Ahuja is an Indian music producer and music composer.

Films 
 Yaariyan (2008 film)
 Pooja Kiven AA
 Jora 10 Numbaria

References

External links
 
 

Living people
People from Delhi
Indian film score composers
1978 births
Indian male film score composers